Belaugh is a small village (population 105) increasing to 134 at the 2011 Census, that occupies a bend in the River Bure in Norfolk, England - within The Broads National Park. It is accessible via the road between Hoveton and Coltishall or from the river. It contains no pubs or shops. The main civic features are the church of St Peter, Belaugh and the Old School, which also belongs to the church and is used for parish council meetings and for celebrating the harvest festival. The local broad is Belaugh Broad. Most of the land around Belaugh - about  - is owned by the Trafford family, who are Lords of the Manor.

History of Belaugh 
The Domesday Book of 1086 contains one of the earliest recorded mentions of the village, at the time known as Belaga. Other records from around the time name it as Belihagh, Belaw, Bilhagh or Bilough, names based on combinations of Norse, Danish and Anglo-Saxon words that collectively mean 'a dwelling place by the water'.

Belaugh St Peter 
Belaugh St Peter is a Church of England church located at the top of a steep slope above the village. It was built circa 14th century and contains an ornate rood screen decorated with images of the apostles that appears to have been added in the early 16th century. In the 17th century a soldier loyal to Oliver Cromwell (described in a letter to Sheriff Tofts of Norwich as a 'godly trooper') scraped away the faces of the apostles, such images being regarded as idolatrous by many of Cromwell's followers. According to records displayed in the church, the letter writer also added disapprovingly that, "The Steeple house [of Belaugh St Peter] stands high, perked like one of the idolatrous high places of Israel". The font of the church is shaped in the Norman style as a cauldron made of a blue stone.

One unusual feature of the church is the remains of blank arcading on the outside of the south wall of the nave. If original this looks more Saxon than Norman.

The church organ was built between 1886 and 1904 by the Reverend George Buck, who was rector between 1880–1907 and son of Dr Zephaniah Buck, organist of Norwich Cathedral. George Buck also built church organs for Edingthorpe and Little Melton.

The Belaugh Ghost 
According to information displayed in the church of St Peter Belaugh, in 1695 Richard Slater - a servant at the village's rectory - stole money and jewels from the church and buried them in the rectory garden. When he later returned to dig up the stash, he was discovered by the rector. In the scuffle that followed, the thief drowned in the river. He is supposed to rise up nightly to recover the money, only to be forced down again by the weight of the stolen loot.

Rectors of Belaugh St Peter 
 ---- John de Catfeld
 1330 Robert de Hurdeshulle
 1349 John de Ludham
 1364 William Putyn
 1370 William de Swukbrook
 ---- Henry Rondolph
 1397 Thomas Herteshorn
 1399 John Williamson
 1427 John Joneson
 1430 Henry Bettys
 1439 Robert Popy
 1441 John Hecham
 1467 Robert Ippeswell
 1478 Robert Kyng
 1491 John Felds
 1508 William Franklin
 1510 Thomas Acton
 1518 Thomas Jannys
 1536 William Pawe
 1552 Thomas Abbot
 1554 Gilbert Warren
 1555 Edward Fisher
 1556 Robert Certayn
 1560 John Robinson
 1561 Leo Howlet
 ---- Edward Dunton
 1602 Christopher Witton
 1607 Rogert Fowkes
 1612 Thomas Jermyn
 1660 John Philips
 1663 john Cutelin
 1678 William Newton
 1681 Guwin Nush
 1691 Bainbridge (Dean)
 1711 William Hay
 1763 Henry Headley
 1768 Lancaster Adkin
 1807 John Prowett
 1811 William Newcome
 1824 Robert Bathurst
 1829 Dennis Norris
 1830 William Ferguson
 1834 John Labbock
 1857 John Horatio Nelson
 1873 Francis Humphrey
 1882 George Buck
 1919 Austen Watt
 1929 John Priest Miller
 1929 Henry James
 1932 Alfred Sheffield
 1949 David Davies
 1950 Harry Skellern
 1956 Albert Carling
 1976 Henry Stapleton
 1981 Cedric Bradbury
 1993 Andrew Parsons

War Memorial
Belaugh War Memorial takes the form of a carved wooden plaque in St. Peter's Church. It holds the following names for the First World War:
 Second-Lieutenant C. Laurence Richmond (1890-1915), 5th Battalion, Northumberland Fusiliers
 Private Robert Chapman (d.1917), 4th Battalion, Royal Norfolk Regiment

And, the following for the Second World War:
 Corporal George C. Cutting (1913-1944), 2nd Battalion, Essex Regiment
 Private Charles W. T. Watts (1919-1943), 6th Battalion, Royal Norfolk Regiment
 Frank J. Cottin
 Ernest Jeffrey

References

External links

Broadland
Villages in Norfolk
Civil parishes in Norfolk